The 2015–16 Basketball Championship of Bosnia and Herzegovina was the 15th season of this championship, with 13 teams from Bosnia and Herzegovina participating in it. Igokea won its fifth title on 12 May 2016, when it beat Kakanj 3–1 in the Finals.

Regular season

Second stage

Liga 6

Relegation group

Playoffs

References

External links
Official website

Basketball Championship of Bosnia and Herzegovina
Bosnia
Basketball